Walter Edmond Sear (27 April 1930 – 29 April 2010) was an American recording engineer, musician, instrument importer and designer, inventor, composer and film producer. He was considered a pioneer in the use of the synthesizer and an expert on vintage recording equipment.  Sear ran the Sear Sound recording studio (in Hell's Kitchen); known for its vast collection of vintage analog recording equipment and patronized by artists including Steely Dan, Sonic Youth, David Bowie, Wynton Marsalis, Paul McCartney and Patti Smith.

History
Born in New Orleans, Louisiana, Sear moved with his family to Jackson Heights, Queens at the age of one. Sear started his long and varied career as a classical tuba player. After 4 years at the Curtis Institute of Music, he occasionally subbed as the tuba player for the Philadelphia Orchestra. He later worked as a freelancer in New York City, playing for 6 years with the Radio City Music Hall pit orchestra as well as The Symphony of the Air, The Goldman Band, Sound of Music and numerous commercial studios.

In the late 1950s, he became interested in tuba design and began importing European tubas made to his own specifications from the Czech company Cerveny and the Belgian companies De Prins and Mahillion. He sold these tubas from a Manhattan showroom. These tubas, popular because of their relatively low price, unique design and quality workmanship, were typically engraved with the name "Walter E. Sear, NYC" on the bell. Sear estimated that he imported/produced approximately 2000 such instruments. His background  in chemistry (Temple University with BA degree from the George Washington University) helped with the metallurgical processes that he innovated. He also held a B.M. from the Catholic University of America and undertook doctoral studies at Columbia University.

In the late 1950s, he became friendly with Robert Moog after buying parts from him for a home-made Theremin. In the early 1960s, Sear used his music industry connections to become Moog's sales agent and business partner. He encouraged Moog to make his synthesizers more practical; eventually leading (in the late 1960s) to the development of portable synthesizers which could be used during live performances. Sear also became known as a performer and composer (using the Moog synthesizer) for various movie soundtracks including Midnight Cowboy.

Sear's pop compositions were also heard on his Command Records album, The Copper-Plated Integrated Circuit.

He built his first recording studio in 1964; one of the first commercial electronic music studios. Sear Sound is the oldest recording studio in New York City, with more than 285 vintage and contemporary microphones, four rebuilt Studer recorders  used by the Beatles at Abbey Road and one of the earliest Moog synthesizers, built by Sear and Moog.

Sear received an Honorable Discharge from the regular United States Air Force with the rank of Staff Sergeant. He served at Bolling Air Force Base in Washington, D.C.

Sear died on 29 April 2010 in New York.

References

External links

 

1930 births
2010 deaths
Musicians from New Orleans
American audio engineers
American classical tubists
People from Jackson Heights, Queens
Curtis Institute of Music alumni
Catholic University of America alumni
Columbia University alumni
Film producers from Louisiana
20th-century classical musicians